The Jerusalem Music Centre is an institute for musical education in Mishkenot Sha’ananim, Jerusalem. The centre helps young Israeli musicians to develop their talents through multi-annual programs and courses, master classes, and performances. The centre also hosts musical events for the public, including concerts, workshops and seminars.

History

The Jerusalem Music Centre was established in 1973, at the initiative of the violinist and educator Isaac Stern, Jerusalem’s mayor at the time, Teddy Kollek, and British philosopher Isaiah Berlin. The Program for Excelling Young Violinists, including master classes with well-known musicians and chamber ensembles for young musicians, was established in 1980. The Excelling Musicians Program in the IDF, which allows young musicians to continue their studies and development during their military service, was established in 1985 together with the Jerusalem Music Centre. The Jerusalem Quartet, Israel’s first professional chamber group, was formed under the auspices of the Centre and other institutions in 1997. In 2000, the Jerusalem Music Centre established a program for teaching string instruments in elementary schools in Jerusalem and the periphery, together with the Education Ministry.

In 2009, the renowned pianist Murray Perahia was appointed president of the Jerusalem Music Center. Perahia is known for his emphasis on musical theory and the intelligent execution of musical works.

Programs for Excelling Young Musicians
The Programs for excelling young musicians are a whole cluster of programs intended for primary and high school children, typically designed for long-term participation, focusing on children aged 14–18.

The programs’ goal is to significantly enhance the musical education that the participants receive from other sources, such as private teachers or the local conservatory. These programs focus on playing chamber music: Chamber music emphasizes the inclusive, non-competitive and social nature of music; the teaching of chamber music requires resources and expertise beyond the reach of most schools; and, more often than not, chamber music is the most complex, deep and challenging music.

Thus, in the beginning of every school year, participants form ensembles – string quartets, piano trios and so on – and meet for weekly or bi-weekly rehearsals with senior coaches. 6-8 times a year, participants are gathered for an intensive weekend, which allow for more intensive work, the creation of ad hoc different (some times larger) ensembles, as well as special topical workshops (music analysis, rhythm, improvisation, non-western music, contemporary and Israeli music and so on), lectures by various experts, and concerts in which the ensembles play for each other and for their teachers. Twice a year, the participants take part in an intensive 3-week summer course, at end of which they form the Young Israeli Philharmonic Orchestra, and perform in central halls in Jerusalem and Tel Aviv.

Special programs
 '’’Teaching string instruments in elementary schools’’’: This project is aimed at introducing the violin and cello to second- and third-grade pupils attending ten schools in Israel's geographic periphery. The children study violin and cello in small groups, then progress to private lessons and to playing in the school ensemble. The program also includes school concerts, performing with children from other schools, and meetings with outstanding musicians from the Jerusalem Music Centre.
 '’’The Classical Arabic Music Ensemble’’’, comprising 10 musicians, Arabs and Jews, specializing in Arab and Mediterranean music.

Location and Facilities
The Centre houses a hall for lectures, concerts and lessons, a number of smaller studios, and an audio and video recording studio. The Jerusalem Music Centre is part of the Mishkenot Sha’ananim complex, situated in the neighborhood of Yemin Moshe in Jerusalem. The complex includes a convention centre, a hostel for artists and intellectuals taking part in cultural activities in Jerusalem, and a restaurant.

Notable alumni
 Hagai Shaham
 Itamar Golan
 Sharon Kam

References

External links
 A video about the Jerusalem Music Centre

Music in Jerusalem
Education in Jerusalem
Music schools in Israel